Nothing Can Stop Us is a compilation album by Robert Wyatt released in 1982.

Concept
Consisting primarily of tracks released as singles and B-sides during the late 1970s and early 1980s, it only contains one Wyatt composition (the opening track "Born Again Cretin"). The rest of the songs are cover versions, a selection of musically and thematically disparate songs by a very varied collection of original artists, including Ivor Cutler, 1940s protest songs, Billie Holiday, "The Red Flag", and Spanish-language numbers (including a version of "Caimanera/Guantanamera"). There is a rendition of Chic's "At Last I Am Free".

The two songs not previously issued as singles are "Born Again Cretin" (taken from an NME compilation cassette) and "The Red Flag" (which was previously unreleased.) This was the only full-length LP released by Wyatt in the ten years between Ruth Is Stranger Than Richard (1975) and his fourth solo studio album Old Rottenhat (1985)

In 1979, Peter Blackman read his poem Stalingrad (about the Soviet Union's fight against Nazi Germany during the Battle of Stalingrad) to an enthusiastic audience that included Jack Dash, a famous communist trade unionist and leader of many British dock workers. After hearing Blackman perform the poem, Wyatt convinced him to record it. The recording ended up as the B-side of Wyatt's 1981 single Stalin Wasn't Stallin', a cover of a Golden Gate Jubilee Quartet song about the Nazi invasion of the Soviet Union. The lyrics of which praise the Soviet people and especially Joseph Stalin (the Soviet leader of the time and namesake of the city of Stalingrad, where the battle happened) for fighting back against the Nazi invaders. Wyatt recorded the cover to remind the Western World that although they were enemies of the Soviet Union during the Cold War during the 1980s, they were allies of them against the bigger enemy of the Nazis during World War II in the 1940s when the Golden Gate Jubilee Quartet wrote and recorded the original Stalin Wasn't Stallin.

Release
In America, Nothing Can Stop Us was released on CD paired with Old Rottenhat under the title Compilation.

Reception and later recordings

The song "Born Again Cretin" is sampled in the 1999 Italian single "Re-Born Again Cretin" by Almamegretta and Dub Colossus, featuring the vocals of Julianna, which originally appeared on the 1998 album Robert Wyatt e Noi - The Different You, a compilation on CPI Records.

Track listing
"Born Again Cretin"  (Robert Wyatt) – 3:10
"At Last I Am Free"  (Nile Rodgers, Bernard Edwards) – 4:17
"Caimanera"  (Carlos Puebla, Joseíto Fernández) - 5:18
"Grass"  (Ivor Cutler) – 2:39
"Stalin Wasn't Stallin'  (Willie Johnson) – 3:22
"Shipbuilding" (Elvis Costello, Clive Langer) - 3:06 (Bonus track added to reissues after 1983)
"Red Flag" (Traditional; arranged by Jim Connell) – 3:09
"Strange Fruit"  (Lewis Allan)– 3:37
"Arauco"  (Violeta Parra) – 4:35
"Trade Union"  (Abdus Salique) – 3:44
"Stalingrad"  (Peter Blackman) – 5:46

Personnel
Robert Wyatt - vocals
Mogotsi Mothle - double bass on "At Last I Am Free" and "Strange Fruit"
Frank Roberts - keyboards on "At Last I Am Free" and "Strange Fruit"
Bill MacCormick - bass on "Caimanera" and "Arauco"
Harry Beckett - flugelhorn on "Caimanera"
Kadir Durvesh - shehnai on "Grass" and "Trade Union"
Esmail Shek - tabla on "Grass" and "Trade Union"

Album cover
The sleeve artwork is by Wyatt's wife Alfreda Benge.

References

Robert Wyatt albums
1982 compilation albums
Rough Trade Records compilation albums